Eulithidium thalassicola, common name the turtle grass pheasant shell, is a species of sea snail, a marine gastropod mollusk in the family Phasianellidae.

Description
The height of the shell varies between 2 mm and 7.1 mm.

Distribution
This species occurs in the Gulf of Mexico, the Caribbean Sea and the Lesser Antilles; in the Western Atlantic Ocean from North Carolina to Brazil.

References

 d'Orbigny, A. 1842. Mollusques. Histoire Physique, Politique et Naturelle de l'île de Cuba 2: 1–112, pls. 10–21?. Arthus Bertrand: Paris.
 Robertson, R. 1958. The family Phasianellidae in the Western Atlantic. Johnsonia 3: 245–283. 
 Turgeon, D.D., et al. 1998. Common and scientific names of aquatic invertebrates of the United States and Canada. American Fisheries Society Special Publication 26 page(s): 59 
 Rosenberg, G., F. Moretzsohn, and E. F. García. 2009. Gastropoda (Mollusca) of the Gulf of Mexico, Pp. 579–699 in Felder, D.L. and D.K. Camp (eds.), Gulf of Mexico–Origins, Waters, and Biota. Biodiversity. Texas A&M Press, College Station, Texas.

External links
 

Phasianellidae
Gastropods described in 1958